SHARPFINGER® is a brand of knife modeled after the  Schrade 152 OT. The SHARPFINGER trademark is designated to a variety of knives in this design ( upswept blade) by a number of makers.

History
The Sharpfinger was primarily produced by American companies such as Imperial Schrade and Camillus Cutlery Company, as well as by custom knifemakers. Imperial Schrade closed down U.S. operations in 2004, with Camillus following in 2007, and the rights to those brand-names were sold. The Schrade Sharpfinger is currently produced in China in both large and small sizes and are not the same quality as the original Schrade.

Description
The blade has a pronounced curve, distinctive from most other utility knives marketed in the United States, as well as being smaller than the average American utility or hunting knife.

Variants
Schrade-Walden Sharp Finger (USA) -- high carbon steel, rare variant
Schrade 152 Old Timer Sharpfinger (USA) -- high carbon steel
Schrade 152 Uncle Henry Wolverine (USA) -- stainless
Camillus Grand'Pa Sharp Hunter (USA)
Rigid Max Edge Hunter (USA)
Arrowhead Roadrunner (USA)
Taylor/Schrade LLC Sharpfinger (China)
Winchester (China)-- 

Variants of the Sharpfinger were offered with the following handle materials:

Smooth colored Delrin (cream, yellow, orange, black)
Scrimshawed cream Delrin
Stag (several patterns)
Staglon (several patterns)
Jigged bone (various cuts and colors)
Wood (various types)

Famous owners
Probably the most famous user of a Schrade Sharpfinger knife is Sonny Barger, founder of the  Hells Angels Motorcycle Club.

In an interview with Harper/Collins regarding his book "Dead in 5 Heartbeats", Barger commented on the Sharpfinger knife:  "A lot of people I ride with carry that knife. I actually prefer fixed blades — like the Sharpfinger — to a folded blade. Although I carry a folded blade too, with a fixed blade you don't have to reach inside your pocket. It's always handy, on your belt when you need it. I use my Sharpfinger as a tool. I do everything with it. I like knives with sharp points. You never know when you might want to pop a balloon or peel a banana."

Marc "Animal" MacYoung and Fred Perrin hold favorable views of the Sharpfinger as Animal discusses in his book "Knives, Knife Fighting and Related Hassles" and the Nemo Sandman site for Fred Perrin in the 1990s.

References

External links
Article on Sharpfinger forms and variants by Codger of "Collectors of Schrades R Us"

Knives